Clarisse Leite Dias Baptista (January 11, 1917 – May 11, 2003) was a Brazilian composer, pianist and music educator. She was born in São Paulo and studied in São Paulo and France. After completing her studies, she worked as a professor of music at Academia Internacional, Rio de Janeiro.

Her sons Cláudio César Dias Baptista, Arnaldo Dias Baptista and Sérgio Dias Baptista became rock musicians.

Works
Leite composed for orchestra, chamber, piano and vocal performance. She was known for compositions based on Brazilian folklore. Selected works include:
Suite Nordestina (1971) including 1) Baticum, 2) Prece por Maria Bonita (A Prayer to Maria Bonita) and 3) Jacunços (Gunmen)
Duo concertante no. 1 for pianos
- Feche os olhinhos que o soninho vem (Close your eyes and the sleep will come) (berceuse) for piano solo
- Dança dos esquilos (dance of the squirrels)(maxi-slide) for piano solo
- Vendaval (gale) (Fantasia) for piano solo
- Yoga - (Espumas flutuantes) (Yoga - floating foams) for piano solo

Her works have been recorded and issued on CD, including:
Brasileira: Piano Music by Brazilian Women, 2004, Centaur Records

References

1917 births
2003 deaths
20th-century classical composers
Brazilian music educators
Women classical composers
Brazilian classical composers
Women music educators
20th-century women composers